Kung or Küng may refer to:

 ǃKung people
 ǃKung language
 Kung (Haida village), an historical village of the Haida people of the Queen Charlotte Islands of British Columbia, Canada; also Kung Indian Reserve No. 11 at the same location
 Kung, alternate name of Kong, Iran, city on the Persian Gulf
 Kung (宮), first note in the Chinese pentatonic scale or do
 "Kung", a song by the rock band Phish
 Kung (comics), a supervillain from DC Comics
 Kung, Sila Lat, Sila Lat District, Sisaket Province, Thailand
 KUNG, a vehicle module
 Küng Blockflöten GmbH, Swiss recorder maker

Surnames
 Küng (also Kueng), people with the surname
 Kong (surname) or 孔; Kung is a transliteration of this common Chinese and Korean surname